Margarita Sergeyevna Aliychuk (born 10 August 1990) is a Russian group rhythmic gymnast and Olympic champion.

Career 
Aliychuk was a member of the gold medal-winning Russian group at the 2007 World Championships in Patras, Greece. She was also a member of the Russian group that competed at the 2008 Summer Olympics in Beijing where she received a gold medal in the rhythmic group competition.

Personal life 
Aliychuk is a resident of the city of Omsk, Russia.

Detailed Olympic results

References

External links
 

1990 births
Living people
People from Seversk
Russian rhythmic gymnasts
Gymnasts at the 2008 Summer Olympics
Olympic gymnasts of Russia
Olympic gold medalists for Russia
Olympic medalists in gymnastics
Medalists at the 2008 Summer Olympics
Medalists at the Rhythmic Gymnastics World Championships
Medalists at the Rhythmic Gymnastics European Championships
Sportspeople from Tomsk Oblast